Panghat is a Bollywood film. It was released in 1943.

Synopsis
Durgaprasad Chaturvedi has built a community well for the local people's use. After his passing, his son Jamunaprasad administers the well, restricting its use. Jamunaprasad wishes to marry his daughter Radha to Mohan, son of a businessman. But as it turns out, Mohan is not who he claims to be.

References

External links
 

1943 films
1940s Hindi-language films
Indian black-and-white films